Roman Arch who was an Australian bred racehorse that was foaled in 1998. (Another Roman Arch was foaled in 1995 in New Zealand.)

Roman Arch was most famous for winning the 2006 Australian Cup at the odds of 60/1 with the TAB. His other group 1 win was the 2003 Toorak Handicap ridden by Luke Currie where he beat subsequent Cox Plate winner, Fields of Omagh. Roman Arch also won the 2005 Werribee Cup and 2005 Sandown Classic.

External links
 Roman Arch's racing record

1998 racehorse births
Thoroughbred family 2-e
Racehorses bred in Australia
Racehorses trained in Australia